James Robert Polk (February 28, 1915 – March 18, 1986) was an American basketball coach. Polk coached the Vanderbilt Commodores, the Trinity Tigers, the Saint Louis Billikens and Rice University.    He began his college coaching career as an assistant coach a Georgia Tech during World War II. His first coaching job was at his high school alma mater Tell City High, in Tell City, Indiana.

Early life
Polk was born in Tell City, Indiana and began to play basketball in the 4th grade. After high school, Polk attended the Evansville College from 1936 to 1939. He worked part-time at several jobs, including sweeping out the College President's office, running a movie projector, bank teller and working in a tomato canning factory. to help pay his college expenses. He was a guard on the basketball team under long-time Purple Aces' coach Bill Slyker from 1935-36 to 1938–39.

In Polk's sophomore season (1935–36), Evansille finished 11–7. This would mark the best season for the Purple Aces during Polk's college playing career.

High school coaching
Polk began his career in coaching by accepting a teaching and coaching job at his alma mater Tell City High School, Tell City, Indiana. Polk had graduated only 8 years earlier (1931) after leading the Marksmen to their fifth IHSAA Sectional title.  Polk assisted Ivan Hollen, who also began that season, replacing future Purdue Boilermakers' Head Coach Ray Eddy.

College coaching
After a four-year tenure, Polk joined the U.S. Navy, he was assigned as a physical education instructor at Georgia Tech in the Navy's V-12 Program, he also assisted Georgia Tech head coach Dwayne Keith during the 1943–44 and 1944-45 seasons. After the war, Georgia Tech hired him as their assistant basketball coach.

In 1943, he enlisted in the US Navy and was assigned as a physical education instructor at Georgia Institute of Technology, he spent the 1943–44 and 1944-45 seasons as a Georgia Tech assistant to Dwayne Keith in addition to his US Navy duties, after the war ended he was hired in the same capacity by Georgia Tech.

In February 1947, Vanderbilt was pummeled by the Kentucky Wildcats in the SEC Tournament 98-29, the Commodores Athletic Director (and football coach) Red Sanders decided to upgrade the basketball program by hiring a full-time coach and offering scholarships. His search led him to Bob Polk (another candidate who was interviewed for the job was the future legend, John Wooden, who had led his Indiana State Sycamores to a conference title and an invitation from the NAIA.

Vanderbilt
Polk coached the Vanderbilt Commodores from 1947 to 1961.  There, he won the 1951–52 SEC Tournament. Polk's Vanderbilt teams recorded one losing season in 13 seasons and finished 2nd in the SEC on four occasions. His 1954-55, 1955–56 and 1956–57 squads all finished the season in the Top 20 Associated Press poll.

In his 13 seasons as Vanderbilt coach, Polk mined the rich Southwestern Indiana talent fields to build a consistent winner; players such as SEC First Team members Dave Kardokus (1951) and SEC Second team members Billy Joe Adcock (1948–50), Al Weiss (1951), Bob Dudley Smith (1951) and Dave Kardokus. Heart problems forced Polk to resign after the 1960-61 season. When he left, Polk was the leader in wins for the Commodores (197-106 .650) and had won the 1951 SEC Tourney.

Six of his players were drafted by NBA teams; 
 Bill Depp – 1961 3rd round Boston  
 Jim Henry – 1959 6th round  Minneapolis   
 Al Rochelle – 1957 5th round St. Louis    
 Dan Finch – 1954 Minneapolis   
 George Kelley – 1951 Indianapolis   
 Billy Joe Adcock – 1950 Fort Wayne

Trinity
Polk recovered quickly from his heart attack and accepted the head coaching and athletic director position at Trinity University in San Antonio, Texas. Polk quickly turned the Tigers into a power, leading them from the depths of the Southland Conference to the title in four seasons; he was named the Southland Conference Coach-of-the-Year in 1967 following a record of 16-6. His 1967-68 team was even better, the Tigers racked up a record of 23-7 and advanced to the NCAA College Division tournament, where the Tigers finished 3rd overall. He was also the NCAA National Coach-of-the-Year for the College Division (today's NCAA Div II) in 1968. In his four years at Trinity, Polk compiled a 70-28 record, a Southland title and a National 3rd-place finish. He was chiefly responsible for the Tigers moving to NCAA Division I classification, however, today they are an NCAA Div III school.

Saint Louis
Following his successful tenure at Trinity, Polk accepted the head coaching job at Saint Louis University; he was the 16th head coach in Billikens history and quickly turned around the program.  In his 2nd season, he led them to a share of the Missouri Valley Conference championship and was named the Conference's Coach of the Year.  While at St Louis, he sent two players to the NBA; Harry “Tree” Rogers  and Robin Jones.

Rice
In a return to bigger conference, he accepted the head coaching position at Rice after five seasons at Saint Louis.  However, he was unable to duplicate the earlier success he enjoyed at Vanderbilt.  Polk served as the President of the National Association of Basketball Coaches during the 1974–75 season.

UAB
In April 1977, Polk resigned from Rice and accepted a position as the assistant athletic director at the University of Alabama at Birmingham (UAB). He retired from that position in 1977. He hired Gene Bartow to build the men's basketball program.

Death
Polk died of heart disease at age 71 in Murfreesboro, Tennessee, on March 18, 1986. He is buried in Tell City, Indiana. He was memorialized by his induction into the Tennessee Sports Hall of Fame in 1990.

Head coaching record

References

External links

 University of Evansville Hall of Fame profile
 Tennessee Hall of Fame profile

1915 births
1988 deaths
American men's basketball players
Basketball coaches from Indiana
Basketball players from Indiana
College men's basketball head coaches in the United States
Evansville Purple Aces men's basketball players
Georgia Tech Yellow Jackets men's basketball coaches
High school basketball coaches in Indiana
High school basketball coaches in the United States
People from Tell City, Indiana
Rice Owls men's basketball coaches
Saint Louis Billikens men's basketball coaches
Trinity Tigers men's basketball coaches
Vanderbilt Commodores men's basketball coaches